is a Japanese horror manga artist. Some of his most notable works include Tomie, a series chronicling an immortal girl who drives her stricken admirers to madness; Uzumaki, a three-volume series about a town obsessed with spirals; and Gyo, a two-volume story in which fish are controlled by a strain of sentient bacteria called "the death stench." His other works include The Junji Ito Horror Comic Collection, a collection of his many short stories, and Junji Ito's Cat Diary: Yon & Mu, a self-parody about him and his wife living in a house with two cats. Ito's work has developed a substantial cult following, with some deeming him a significant figure in recent horror iconography.

Life and career
Junji Ito was born on July 31, 1963 in Sakashita, now a part of Nakatsugawa, Gifu. He began his experience in the horror world at a very young age, with his first manga being Mummy Teacher by Kazuo Umezu; his two older sisters read Umezu and Shinichi Koga in magazines, and consequently, he began reading them too. He grew up in the countryside, in a small city next to Nagano. In the house where he lived, the bathroom was at the end of an underground tunnel, where there were spider crickets; such experiences were later reflected in his works.

Ito began to draw manga at the age of 4, taking inspiration from the works he read in magazines. He continued to draw as a hobby until he became a dental technician in 1984, where he struggled to find a balance between the two.

In 1987, he submitted a short story to Monthly Halloween that won an honorable mention in the Kazuo Umezu Prize (with Umezu himself as one of the judges). This story ran for 13 years and was later serialized as Tomie.

Ito drew the cover of Mucc's 2002 album Hōmura Uta. He collaborated with the band again in 2020, for the cover of their made-to-order single "Shōfu 2020". Ito teamed up with Takashi Nagasaki and former diplomat Masaru Sato to create Yūkoku no Rasputin (2010–2012), based on Sato's personal experiences in Russia, for Big Comic.

Film director Guillermo del Toro cited on his official Twitter account that Ito was originally a collaborator for the video game Silent Hills, of which both Del Toro and game designer Hideo Kojima were the main directors. However, a year after its announcement, the project was canceled by Konami, the IP's owner. Ito and Del Toro would later lend their likenesses to Kojima's next project, Death Stranding.

Awards 
Ito's work Uzumaki was nominated for an Eisner Award in 2003 and 2009.

In 2019, Ito received his first Eisner Award for his manga adaptation of Mary Shelley's Frankenstein for "Best Adaptation from Another Medium."

In 2021, Ito received two more Eisner Awards for his works Remina and Venus in the Blind Spot, receiving "Best U.S. Edition of International Material - Asia" and "Best Writer/Artist."

Personal life
In 2006, Ito married Ayako Ishiguro (石黒亜矢子), a picture book artist. As of 2023, they have two children.

Inspiration and themes

Other artists 
In addition to Kazuo Umezu, Ito has cited Hideshi Hino, Shinichi Koga, Yasutaka Tsutsui, Edogawa Ranpo and H. P. Lovecraft as being major influences on his work. Ito has stated that Umezu has inspired his storytelling, and Hino has inspired his ability in creating a mood for a work. He has also stated that he admires Guillermo del Toro's work.

A connection between Lovecraft's work and the spirals of Uzumaki has been placed before, as well as a common theme of cosmic horror.

Ito has also cited H. R. Giger, Salvador Dalí, and others as influences on his work as well.

Childhood 
Ito has been inspired by horror since childhood, with his first manga being written about a protagonist with an eye in the middle of his hand, attacking him; this was heavily influenced by Kappa no Sanpei. Ito was inspired by the occult horror films of the 20th century (such as Dracula and Frankenstein), as well as period dramas of ghosts. He has also found inspiration from Rakugo storytellers who tell Kaiden ghost stories, incorporating it into No Longer Human.

Tomie was inspired by the death of one of his classmates. Ito felt strange that a boy he knew suddenly disappeared from the world, and he kept expecting the boy to show up again; from this came the idea of a girl who is supposed to have died but then just shows up as if nothing had happened. Gyo was influenced by his childhood anti-war feelings, due to his parents' tragic and frightening war stories, and the shark attack scenes from Jaws. The Hanging Balloons was based on a childhood dream. Long Dream was inspired by his sister mentioning research of dreams being instantaneous, and Slug Girl was inspired by Ito moving his tongue around in the mirror and finding that it resembled a slug.

Academics 
Ito studied and graduated from a vocational school with a degree in Dental Technology before working as a dental technician, where he worked for 3 years until he became a full-time mangaka. Ito found anatomical interest in the books for the medical students, which he used to study muscles. He is also cited stating the schooling gave him more inspiration for his tools in drawing, namely pens and how to whittle pencils like dentures.

Themes 
Ito's work consists of many subgenres of horror, mainly being host to the subgenres of body horror and cosmic horror. Much of his work is based solely in them, with other themes including a relationship of predator to prey, a loss of humanity, and obsession being common. The universe Ito depicts is cruel and capricious; his characters often find themselves victims of malevolent unnatural circumstances for no discernible reason or punished out of proportion for minor infractions against an unknown and incomprehensible natural order. He takes inspiration from his own fears as well, including death, war, insects, and being watched.

Ito has been cited saying that he draws the manifestation of the mind becoming reality, represented in body horror.

Works

Manga

 Volume 3: Flesh-Colored Horror (肉色の怪) (collection of six one-shots)
 Collects: The Long Hair in the Attic, Approval, Beehive, Dying Young, Headless Sculptures, and Flesh-Colored Horror
 Volume 4: The Face Burglar (顔泥棒) (collection of five one-shots)
 Collects: The Face Burglar, Scarecrow, Falling, Red String, Honored Ancestors, and The Hanging Balloons
 Volume 5: Souichi's Diary of Delights (双一の楽しい日記) (collection of six one-shots)
 A collection of one-shots featuring Junji Ito's character, Souichi
 Collects: Fun Summer Vacation, Fun Winter Vacation, Souichi's Diary of Delights, Souichi's Home Tutor, Mannequin Teacher, and Souichi's Birthday
 Volume 6: Souichi's Diary of Curses (双一の呪い日記) (collection of five one-shots)
 Sequel collection continuing the Souichi storyline after Souchi's Diary of Delights
 Collects: Souichi's Selfish Curse, The Room With Four Walls, Coffin, Rumors, and Fashion Model
 Volume 7: Slug Girl (なめくじの少女) (collection of seven one-shots)
 Collects: Slug Girl, The Thing That Drifted Ashore, Mold, Shiver, The Inn, Groaning Drain Pipes, and Bio House
 Volume 8: Blood-Bubble Bushes (血玉樹) (collection of seven one-shots)
 Collects: Blood-Bubble Bushes, Unendurable Labyrinth, The Reanimator's Sword, The Will, The Bridge, The Devil's Logic, and The Conversation Room
 Volume 9: Hallucinations (首幻想) (collection of six one-shots)
 Hallucinations stories take place in different dimensions, but share the theme of the titular character/s Oshikiri and the interdimensional portal that exists in his/their house
 Collects: Hallucinations, Bog of the Living Dead, Pen Pal, Intruder, Further Tales of Oshikiri, and Further Tales of Oshikiri: Walls
 Volume 10: Marionette Mansion (あやつりの屋敷) (collection of seven one-shots)
 Collects: Ice Cream Bus, Gang House, The Smoking Club, Used Record, Where the Sandman Lives, The Gift Bearer, and Marionette Mansion 
 Volume 11: The Town Without Streets (道のない街) (collection of five one-shots)
 Collects: The Town Without Streets, Near Miss!, Maptown, Village of the Siren, and The Supernatural Transfer Student
 Volume 12: The Bully (いじめっ娘) (collection of seven one-shots)
 Collects: The Bully, Deserter, A Father's Love, Memory, The Back Alley, Scripted Love, and In The Soil
 Volume 13: The Circus is Here (サーカスが来た) (collection of five one-shots)
 Collects: The Circus is Here, Gravetown, The Adjacent Window, and both The Bizarre Hikizuri Siblings stories
 Volume 14: The Story of the Mysterious Tunnel (トンネルの奇譚) (collection of five one-shots)
 Collects: Long Dream, The Story of the Mysterious Tunnel, Bronze Statue, Drifting Spores, and Blood Sickness of the White Sands Village
 Volume 15: Lovesick Dead (死びとの恋わずらい) (five chapters over one volume)
 Ryusuke returns to the town he once lived in because rumors are swirling about girls killing themselves after encountering a bewitchingly handsome young man. Harboring his own secret from time spent in this town, Ryusuke attempts to capture the beautiful boy and close the case, but…
 Volume 16: Frankenstein (フランケンシュタイン)
Junji Ito's manga adaptation of the Mary Shelley novel, Frankenstein; or, The Modern Prometheus
Includes two bonus stories: A Doll's Hellish Burial, and Memories of Real Poop

 Volume 3: The Long Hair in the Attic (屋根裏の長い髪) (collection of 12 one-shots)
 Collects: Bio House, The Face Burglar, Where the Sandman Lives, The Devil's Logic, The Long Hair in the Attic, Scripted Love, The Reanimator's Sword, A Father's Love, Unendurable Labyrinth, Village of the Siren, The Bully, and Deserter
 Volume 4: Scarecrow (案山子) (collections of 12 one-shots)
 Collects: Red String, Used Record, The Gift Bearer, The Bridge, The Circus is Here, Beehive, Maptown, Headless Sculptures, Dying Young, Shiver, Scarecrow, and The Will
 Volume 5: The Back Alley (路地裏) (collection of 11 one-shots)
 Collects: The Back Alley, Fashion Model, Falling, The Conversation Room, The Inn, Approval, The Smoking Club, Mold, The Town Without Streets, Memory, and Ice Cream Bus
 Volume 6: Soichi's Selfish Curse (双一の勝手な呪い) (collection of ten one-shots)
 Reprints The Junji Ito Horror Comic Collection Volumes 5 and 6 (Souichi's Diary of Delights and Souichi's Diary of Curses, respectively), excluding Fashion Model
 Volume 7: Groaning Drain Pipes (うめく配水管) (collection of eight one-shots)
 Collects: The Supernatural Transfer Student, Groaning Drain Pipes, Blood-Bubble Bushes, The Hanging Balloons, Marionette Mansion, Flesh-Colored Horror, Near Miss!, and In the Soil
 Volume 8: Blood Sickness of the White Sands Village (白砂村血譚) (collection of 11 one-shots)
 Reprints The Junji Ito Horror Comic Collection Volumes 14: The Story of the Mysterious Tunnel
 Includes six bonus stories: Gravetown, Gang House, Slug Girl, The Adjacent Window, The Thing That Drifted Ashore, and Honored Ancestors
 Volume 9: Oshikiri Idan & Frankenstein (押切異談＆フランケンシュタイン)
 Reprints The Junji Ito Horror Comic Collection Volumes 9 and 16 (Junji Ito's Frankenstein and Hallucinations, respectively)
 Includes three bonus stories: A Doll's Hellish Burial, Fixed Face, and Junji Ito's Dog Diary
 Volume 10: Lovesick Dead (死びとの恋わずらい) (five chapters over one volume)
 Reprinting of The Junji Ito Horror Comic Collection Volume 15: Lovesick Dead
 Includes bonus stories: Both The Bizarre Hikizuri Siblings stories, Phantom Mansion, Ribs Woman, and Memories of Real Poop

  (Shogakukan: 2010) 
 The Art of Junji Ito: Twisted Visions (異形 世界)
 A first-ever collection of Junji Ito’s artworks, featuring over 130 images from his bestselling manga titles along with rare works. This collection includes Ito’s illustrations in both black-and-white and color, from Tomie’s dreadful beauty to the inhuman spirals of Uzumaki. Includes an interview focused on Ito’s art technique as well as commentary from the artist on each work.
 Black Paradox (ブラックパラドクス) (six chapters over one volume)
 Four people intent on killing themselves meet through the suicide website Black Paradox: Maruso, a nurse who despairs about the future; Taburo, a man who is tortured by his doppelganger; Pii-tan, an engineer with his own robot clone; and Baracchi, a girl who agonizes about the birthmark on her face.
 Includes two bonus stories: The Licking Woman and Mystery Pavilion
 A Diary of Embellished Patches (潤色まだら日記) (collection of three one-shots)
 Collects: Pond, Conversation, and DIY Instructions 
 Dissolving Classroom (溶解教室) (five chapters over one volume)
 A pair of twisted siblings—Yuuma, a young man obsessed with the devil, and Chizumi, the worst little sister in recorded history—cause all sorts of tragic and terrifying things to happen wherever they go. These scary short stories will shock the reader with a literal interpretation of the ills that plague modern society.
 Includes two bonus stories: The Return and Children of the Earth
 Deserter: Junji Ito Story Collection (脱走兵のいる家) (collection of 12 one-shots)
 Reprint of Museum of Terror Volume 3: The Long Hair in the Attic
 Fragments of Horror (a.k.a. The Shard of Evil) (魔の断片) (collection of eight one-shots)
 Collects: Futon, Haunted Wood Mansion, Tomio: Red Turtleneck, Lingering Farewell, Dissection Girl, Black Bird, Nanakuse Magami and Whispering Woman 
 Frankenstein: Junji Ito Story Collection (フランケンシュタイン)
 Reprints Museum of Terror Volume 9: Oshikiri Idan & Frankenstein
 Gyo: Ugomeku Bukimi (a.k.a. Fish: Ghastly Squirming) (ギョ うごめく不気味) (19 chapters over two volumes)
 The floating smell of death hangs over the island. What is it? A strange, legged fish appears on the scene... So begins Tadashi and Kaori's spiral into the horror and stench of the sea.
 Includes two bonus stories: The Sad Tale of the Principal Post and The Enigma of Amigara Fault
 Junji Ito's Cat Diary: Yon & Mu (伊藤潤二の猫日記 よん&むー) (ten chapters over one volume)
 Junji Ito, as J-kun, has recently built a new house and has invited his financée, A-ko, to live with him. Little did he know, his blushing bride-to-be has some unexpected company in tow—Yon, a ghastly-looking family cat, and Mu, an adorable Norwegian forest cat. Despite being a dog person, J-kun finds himself purrsuaded by their odd cuteness and thus begins his comedic struggle to gain the affection of his new feline friends.
 The Liminal Zone (幻怪地帯) (collection of four one-shots)
 Collects: Weeping Woman Way, Madonna, The Spirit Flow of Aokigahara, and Slumber
 Lovesickness: Junji Ito Story Collection (死びとの恋わずらい)
 Reprint of Museum of Terror Volume 10: Lovesick Dead
 Mimi's Ghost Stories (ミミの怪談) (collection of six one-shots, adapted from Hirokatsu Kihara and Ichiro Nakayama's Kaidan Shin Mimibukuro (怪談新耳袋))
 Collects: The Woman Next Door, Sound of Grass, Graveman, The Seashore, Alone With You (a.k.a. Just the Two of Us), and The Scarlet Circle
 No Longer Human (人間失格) (24 chapters over one volume)
 Ito's manga adaptation of the Osamu Dazai novel of the same name
 Remina (a.k.a. Hellstar Remina) (地獄星レミナ) (six chapters over one volume)
 This is a horror/sci-fi story about a giant planet-consuming creature from another dimension that a scientist discovers and mistakenly identifies as a planet. Being given the honor to name it as its discoverer, the professor chooses to name it after his only daughter, Remina, but when Hellstar Remina is headed on a direct collision course with Earth the world goes insane and all the people in the city start a witch hunt to kill Remina, thinking she is somehow to blame.
 Includes bonus story: Billions Alone (a.k.a. Army of One)
 Sensor (a.k.a. Travelogue of the Succubus) (センサー) (seven chapters over one volume)
 A woman walks alone at the foot of Mount Sengoku. A man appears, saying he has been waiting for her, and invites her to a nearby village. Surprisingly, the village is covered in hair-like volcanic glass fibers, and all of it shines a bright gold. At night, when the villagers perform their custom of gazing up at the starry sky, countless unidentified flying objects come raining down on them—the opening act for the terror is about to occur.
 Shiver: Junji Ito Selected Stories (伊藤潤二自選傑作集) (collection of ten one-shots)
 Collects: Used Record, Shiver, Fashion Model, The Hanging Balloons, Marionette Mansion, Painter, Long Dream, Honored Ancestors, Glyceride (a.k.a. Greased), and Fashion Model: Cursed Frame
 Tomie (富江) (20 chapters over one volume)
 Tomie Kawakami is a femme fatale with long black hair and a beauty mark just under her left eye. She can seduce nearly any man, and drive them to murder as well, even though the victim is often Tomie herself. While one lover seeks to keep her for himself, another grows terrified of the immortal succubus. But soon they realize that no matter how many times they kill her, the world will never be free of Tomie.
 Does not include Tomie: Takeover or (the Souichi/Tomie crossover one-shot) Souichi Possessed
 Venus in the Blind Spot (盲点のビーナス) (collection of ten one-shots)
 Collects: Billions Alone (a.k.a. Army of One), The Human Chair and An Unearthly Love (adapted from the Edogawa Ranpo stories of the same name), Venus in the Blind Spot, The Licking Woman, Umezz Kazuo and Me, How Love Came to Professor Kirida (adapted from Robert Hichen's How Love Came to Professor Guildea), The Enigma of Amigara Fault, The Sad Tale of the Principal Post, and Keepsake
 Voices in the Dark (闇の声) (collection of seven one-shots)
 Collects: Blood-Slurping Darkness, The Ghost of Golden Time, Roar of Ages, Secret of the Haunted Mansion, Glyceride (a.k.a. Greased), The Earthbound, and Dead Man Calling 
 New Voices in the Dark ( 新・闇の声 潰談) (collection of seven one-shots)
 Collects: The Soichi Front, Soichi's Beloved Pet, In the Valley of Mirrors, Anything but a Ghost, Library of Illusions, Songs in the Dark, and Splatter Film 
 Smashed: Junji Ito Story Collection (collection of 13 one shots)
 Reprints Voices in the Dark and New Voices in the Dark, with the exception of Glyceride (a.k.a. Greased)
 Uzumaki (a.k.a. Spiral) (うずまき) (19 chapters over one volume)
 Kurozu-cho, a small fogbound town on the coast of Japan, is cursed. According to Shuichi Saito, the withdrawn boyfriend of teenager Kirie Goshima, their town is haunted not by a person or being but by a pattern: uzumaki, the spiral, the hypnotic secret shape of the world. It manifests itself in small ways: seashells, ferns, whirlpools in water, whirlwinds in air. And in large ways: the spiral marks on people's bodies, the insane obsessions of Shuichi's father, the voice from the cochlea in your inner ear. As the madness spreads, the inhabitants of Kurozu-cho are pulled ever deeper, as if into a whirlpool from which there is no return...
 Includes bonus story: Galaxies
 Specials and uncollected one-shots Demon's Voice
 Ghost Heights Management Association
 Junji Ito's Snow White (adapted from Snow White)
 Layers of Fear
 Mountain of Gods: Precipice of the Unknown
 Mr. Inagawa's Ghost Story Treasure Box
 Mystery Pavilion
 Return of the Hanging Balloons
 She is a Slow Walker (written for 8 Tales of the ZQN, the I Am a Hero spin-off anthology)
 Soichi Possessed
 The Summer Time Graduation Trip
 Tomie: Takeover

 Illustrations 
 Magic: The Gathering
 Elesh Norn, Mother of Machines (Phyrexia: All Will Be One)
 A special promotion for hand-signed Elesh Norn, Mother of Machines was held in Japan.

Adaptations

Tomie was adapted into a series of films, beginning in 1999. Several other works of Ito's have subsequently been adapted for film, television and videogaming:
 Tomie''' Tomie (富江), 1998
 Tomie: Another Face (a.k.a. Tomie: Fearsome Beauty) (富江:アナザフェイス), 1999
 Tomie: Replay (富江:re-play), 2000
 Tomie: Re-birth (富江:re-birth), 2001
 Tomie: The Final Chapter – Forbidden Fruit (富江 最終章 ?禁断の果実), 2002
 Tomie: Beginning (富江 BEGINNING), 2005
 Tomie: Revenge (富江 REVENGE), 2005
 Tomie vs Tomie (富江 vs 富江), 2007
 Tomie Unlimited (富江　アンリミテッド), 2011
 The Fearsome Melody (戦慄の旋律), 1991 – (adapted from Used Record)
 Uzumaki (うずまき), 2000 – (adapted from the story of the same name)
 Uzumaki - Television Mystery (うずまき 〜電視怪奇篇〜), 2000 – (adapted from the story of the same name)
 Uzumaki - Curse Simulation (うずまき 〜呪いシミュレーション〜), 2000 – (adapted from the story of the same name)
 Gravetown (墓標の町), 2000 – (adapted from the short story of the same name)
 With no DVD/VHS release, this work is considered a lost television broadcast
 The Face Burglar (顔泥棒), 2000 – (adapted from the short story of the same name)
 The Hanging Balloons (首吊り気球), 2000 – (adapted from The Devil's Logic, The Long Hair in the Attic, and The Hanging Balloons)
 Long Dream (長い夢), 2000 – (adapted from the short story of the same name)
 Partition (a.k.a. Oshikiri) (押切), 2000 – (adapted from Intruder)
 Scarecrow (案山子), 2001 – (adapted from the short story of the same name)
 Love Ghost  (死びとの恋わずらい), 2001 – (adapted from The Junji Ito Horror Comic Collection Volume 15: Lovesick Dead)
 Marronnier (マロニエ), 2004 – (loosely adapted from Marionette Mansion and A Doll's Hellish Burial)
 The Groaning Drain (うめく排水管), 2004 – (adapted from Groaning Drain Pipes)
 Tomio (富夫), 2011 – (adapted from Tomio: Red Turtleneck)Gyo: Tokyo Fish Attack, 2012 – (adapted from Gyo: Ugomeku Bukimi)Tales of the Bizarre: 2015 Spring Special - The Earthbound (世にも奇妙な物語 スペシャル・春  - 地縛者), 2015 – (adapted from The Earthbound)
 Junji Ito Collection, 2018NextDoor, 2021 – (adapted from The Woman Next Door)Junji Ito Maniac: Japanese Tales of the Macabre, 2023Uzumaki, TBD

References

External links

 
 English Fansite
 The Horrifyingly Beautiful Junji Itō : Collection Exhibit at ACG_Labo 

 Interviews 

 A Talk with Junji Ito | Creator Interview | VIZ Junji Ito tells us the secret of making stories TRULY scary | VIZ Into the Spiral: A Conversation with Japanese Horror Maestro Junji Ito
 Junji Ito Interview | Adapting No Longer Human | VIZ Junji Ito Tours A Real Haunted House ( The Winchester Mystery House ) Conversation with Junji Ito | TCAF 2019 | VIZ A Haunting Conversation with Junji Ito | Comic-Con@Home 2020 | VIZ Comic-Con@Home 2021 | Junji Ito Panel | VIZ''

1963 births
Living people
Japanese horror writers
Manga artists from Gifu Prefecture
Horror artists
Weird fiction writers